Jamison Rudy Van Brewer (born November 19, 1980) is an American former professional basketball player. A point guard, he played four years in the National Basketball Association.

College career
Brewer played two years of college basketball, attending Auburn University; in his last year, he averaged 8 points, 7 rebounds and 6 assists.

Professional career
Brewer was selected by the Indiana Pacers in the second round (40th overall) in the 2001 NBA draft.

During his three-year spell with the team, he only amassed 36 regular season games combined, spending most of the time in the injured reserve list, and averaging slightly more than two points. On December 20, 2003, he scored a career-high 12 points at the Minnesota Timberwolves, on 5-for-11 shooting (80–102 loss).

Brewer was signed as a restricted free agent by the New York Knicks in the 2004 off-season. After only 18 appearances, he was traded to the San Antonio Spurs in February 2005, being waived without any appearances. He was again signed by the Knicks prior to the start of 2005–06, being immediately cut.

Holding NBA career averages of 1.6 points, 1.0 assists and 0.9 rebounds, Brewer's final NBA game was played on February 11, 2005 in a 94 - 111 loss to the Boston Celtics where he played for four and half minutes and recorded no stats.

Brewer subsequently played – also shortly – with Croatia's KK Cibona (2006), Hollywood Fame (2006–07), Dexia Mons-Hainaut in Belgium (2007) and the NBA Development League's Bakersfield Jam (2007–08).

Late in 2009, Brewer was signed by Esporte Clube Pinheiros in São Paulo, Brazil, until the end of the Brazilian League season.

For the 2010–2011 season, Brewer signed with BC Odessa in the Ukrainian Basketball Super League, but he was released in January 2011.

In February 2011, Brewer signed with Eisbären Bremerhaven.

Career statistics

NBA

Source

Regular season

|-
| align="left" | 
| align="left" | Indiana
| 13 || 0 || 3.3 || .400 || .000 || – || .6 || .7 || .2 || .0 || .3
|-
| align="left" | 
| align="left" | Indiana
| 10 || 0 || 8.0 || .529 || .000 || .444 || .9 || 1.8 || .2 || .1 || 2.2
|-
| align="left" | 
| align="left" | Indiana
| 13 || 1 || 12.3 || .371 || .357 || .167 || .8 || 1.3 || .5 || .0 || 2.5
|-
| align="left" | 
| align="left" | New York
| 18 || 0 || 10.3 || .297 || .200 || .462 || 1.2 || .7 || .4 || .1 || 1.7
|-
| align="left" | Career
| align="left" |
| 54 || 1 || 8.7 || .372 || .250 || .393 || .9 || 1.0 || .4 || .0 || 1.6

Playoffs

|-
| align="left" | 2002
| align="left" | Indiana
| 2 || 0 || 3.0 || .000 || – || .500 || 2.0 || .5 || .0 || .0 || .5

References

External links
NBA.com profile
NBA stats @ Basketball-reference
Basketpedya career data

1980 births
Living people
African-American basketball players
American expatriate basketball people in Belgium
American expatriate basketball people in Brazil
American expatriate basketball people in Croatia
American expatriate basketball people in Germany
American expatriate basketball people in Ukraine
American men's basketball players
Auburn Tigers men's basketball players
Bakersfield Jam players
Basketball players from Georgia (U.S. state)
Basketball players from Maryland
BC Odesa players
Belfius Mons-Hainaut players
Eisbären Bremerhaven players
Esporte Clube Pinheiros basketball players
Indiana Pacers draft picks
Indiana Pacers players
KK Cibona players
New York Knicks players
Novo Basquete Brasil players
People from East Point, Georgia
People from Silver Spring, Maryland
Point guards
Sportspeople from Fulton County, Georgia
Sportspeople from Montgomery County, Maryland
21st-century African-American sportspeople
20th-century African-American people